Luis R. "Narmito" Ortiz Lugo is a Puerto Rican politician affiliated with the Popular Democratic Party (PPD). He was elected to the Puerto Rico House of Representatives in 2012 to represent District 30

Early life and education
Graduated at Rafael López Landrón, where he studied refrigeration technician. He holds a Bachelor's degree in Business Administration with a specialty in Management from the Interamerican University of Puerto Rico, Metropolitan Campus.

Career
In his work experience he served as a Network Administration Services Officer in the Puerto Rico Aqueduct and Sewerage Authority where he worked for 23 years and in different positions. He was inducted into the Guayama Sports Hall of Fame for winning the championship in sports as the owner for the Marlins de Barrancas Baseball Class A. Was elected in the 2012 elections to the Puerto Rico House of Representatives to represent District 30. He currently chairman the Emergency Preparedness, Reconstruction and Reorganization Commission and the Southeast Region Commission.

Family
Is married to Judith Alvarado Ruiz and has 2 sons.

References

Interamerican University of Puerto Rico alumni
Living people
Popular Democratic Party members of the House of Representatives of Puerto Rico
People from Guayama, Puerto Rico
1968 births